Extravaganza is a two-hour comedy variety show taped in Jakarta, Indonesia, which has been broadcast by Trans TV on Saturday and Monday night since its debut on May 30, 2004 until November 28, 2009. At the time, it's the most popular comedy variety show in Indonesia.

Cast 
 Tora Sudiro
 Indra Birowo
 Rony Dozer Karli
 Virnie Ismail
 Ronal Surapradja
 Tike Priatnakusumah
 Aming
 Tinka Dasia*
 Mieke Amalia*
 Sogi Indra Dhuaja
 Gilang Dirgahari
 And other new characters: Edric Tjandra, Lia Ananta*, Ence Bagus, and Farid Shigeta*.

It also stars four finalists of Kampus Extravaganza, a show to find new characters ('extras') for Extravaganza. They are T.J., Sentot* now known as (Papham Ashari), Ananda Omesh and Ammho*. There are also newer members, like Cathy Sharon and Luna Maya

Notes: *(*)No longer starred in Extravaganza

Show 
Every episode of Extravaganza will have guests, for example: Cinta Laura, Ungu, etc.

The show became successful due to its creativity and originality, a new, fresh kind of comedy show in Indonesia. This however, is debatable since the format of the show appeared to be strongly based on foreign comedy shows, most prominently the American Saturday Night Live (SNL). Most of the comedic scenario the show used was based (sometimes even almost identical, word for word) on jokes circulating in the Internet and common Indonesian jokes.

Segment in Extravaganza 

Some segment on Extravaganza such as:
  (Comedy Sketch) - Comedy story like the real-life story. Usually based on true life-story, anime, manga, Western cartoon, Indonesia fighting, folktale, or even pre-historic era.
  - Parody of Trans TV program Ceriwis with the tagline "Yoo...Miss..."
  (Extravaganza Legend)
  (Extravaganza Talk) - Talk show segment with Tike Priyatnakusumah.
  - News segment presented by Edric Tjandra, Indra Birowo or Shogi. Edric always presented the news with perfunctory Chinese language.
  - Infotainment segment presented by Tike and TJ which brought with Sundanese song.
  - Music quiz parodied from TVRI program Berpacu Dalam Melodi.
  (Celebrity Crosswords)
  - Music segment which presented some Indonesian music video clip that had been parodied by the Extravaganza cast.
  - Like , but the real-show that been parodied is the Trans TV program Termehek-Mehek.
  - A segment that introduced people with some unique and strange look.

Trivia 
 Aming, Indra Birowo, and Tora Sudiro appears at Indonesian movie, "Janji Joni".
 Indra Birowo and Ence Bagus starred in the movie "Setannya Kok Beneran".

External links 
Official site

Indonesian comedy television series
2004 Indonesian television series debuts
Indonesian variety television shows
2009 Indonesian television series endings
Trans TV original programming